The list of ship launches in 1758 includes a chronological list of some ships launched in 1758.


References

1758
Ship launches